Kenneth W. Keller (August 16, 1922 – February 24, 1983) was an American professional basketball player. At 6'1" (1.85 m) and 180 lb (82 kg), he played as a guard for the Washington Capitols and the Providence Steamrollers during the 1946–47 BAA season. He attended the University of Vermont and St. John's University.

BAA career statistics

Regular season

References

External links

1922 births
1983 deaths
American men's basketball players
Bishop Loughlin Memorial High School alumni
Point guards
Professional Basketball League of America players
Providence Steamrollers players
St. John's Red Storm men's basketball players
Vermont Catamounts men's basketball players
Washington Capitols players